The 1948–49 season saw Rochdale compete for their 21st season in the Football League Third Division North.

Statistics
																				

|}

Final league table

Competitions

Football League Third Division North

F.A. Cup

Lancashire Cup

References

Rochdale A.F.C. seasons
Rochdale